The Kiel Week or Kiel Regatta is an annual sailing event in Kiel, the capital of Schleswig-Holstein, Germany. It is the largest sailing event in Europe, and also one of the largest Volksfeste in Germany, attracting millions of people every year from all over Germany and neighbouring countries.

Events 
Kiel Week is held annually in the last week in June, and opens officially on the preceding Saturday with the official Glaser, followed by the Holstenbummel. The "Soundcheck" is on the Friday before the official opening; it is a music festival across all the stages within the city. Kiel Week, ends with a large fireworks display at 11 p.m. on Sunday, fired from pontoons or the quays at the Howaldtswerke, visible all across the Bay of Kiel. There are also many minigames 

Most ship races begin at the Olympic Harbor of Schilksee, also the centre of most sporting activities during Kiel Week. As Schilksee is located outside of the inner city and most sailing competitions take place yet further out, only some races – mainly of smaller boat types – can be viewed from shore, namely from along the Kiellinie at the west coast of the Bay of Kiel.

Kiel Week usually gathers around 5,000 sailors, 2,000 ships, and about three million visitors each year. The event is organized in a joint effort by the Yacht Club of Kiel, the Norddeutscher Regattaverein, the Hamburger Sailing Club, and the Verein Seglerhaus am Wannsee.

While Kiel Week started out as a ship racing championship, it has long since become a large festival with many popular bands playing on public stages. They often play for free, although the corporate sponsors (many from the Schleswig-Holstein media and telecommunications industry) usually display their involvement prominently. Most of the stages can be found at the Kiellinie (the western side of the Kieler Förde from the Düsternbrook yacht harbour past the Schleswig-Holstein parliament building to the big inner-city ferry harbour), and as of late, across the Hoernbridge to the Germania harbour and the Hörn. Another area of rich cultural activity in the city centre (Rathausplatz, Holstenbrücke) and the area connecting the city centre with the ferry harbour (Alter Markt, Dänische Straße, Schloßpark). Between the public stages and especially on the International Market on the Rathausplatz, food specialties from different countries can be eaten. Small street performances and street comedy are performed in many places. A special children's program is available at the Spiellinie.

Kiel Week is also one of the largest tall ship conventions in Germany, attracting many German and international traditional ships, mainly sailing ships. Many of them spend the week doing day tours out of Kiel, thus berthing much more in view of the festival visitors than the racing boats at Kiel-Schilksee. More than 100 traditional ships and hundreds of yachts usually participate in the Tall Ships Parade (Windjammer‎parade) on the day before the closing day of the Kiel Week, i.e. usually on the second Saturday of Kiel Week. The Parade was first held in 1972, under the name of Operation Sail, and was organized in celebration of the Olympic Summer Games in Germany that year, whose sailing competitions took place in Kiel. It was the first large gathering of tall ships since the time of the windjammers, and its success led to the annual Parade and to the foundation of the first sail training organization in Germany (Clipper DJS). Today, the Parade is often headed by the Gorch Fock, a sister ship to the German-built USCGC Eagle (WIX-327).

Kiel Week Poster and Enamel Plaques
Since 1948, advertises an annual Kiel Week poster for the festival week. Their design is another example of the cultural positioning and visual-design tradition of the Kieler Woche. In this context represents a jury put together a selection of graphic designers and then invites them to a competition for the corporate design of the festival week. An invitation is already an honor, because the design contest enjoys a high reputation and many designs have been awarded national and international prizes.

Among other things, the following graphic artists designed for the Kiel Week: Ernst Irmler (1953), Anton Stankowski (1962), Hans Hillmann (1964), Michael Engelmann (1965), Bruno K. Wiese (1971 & 1982), Rolf Müller (1972), Otto Treumann (1975), Ruedi Baur (1986), Rosemarie Tissi (1990), Hans Günther Schmitz (1992), Christof Gassner (1993), Siegfried Odermatt (1994), Barbara & Gerd Baumann (1995), Wim Crouwel (1998 ), Fons M. Hickmann (2002), Klaus Hesse (2006), Markus Dressen (2007), Peter Zizka (2008), Henning Wagenbreth (2009), Andrew and Jeffrey Goldstein (2010), Melchior Imboden (2011) and Stefan Guzy and Björn re (2015).

The series of Kieler Woche playcards considered as a reflection of the recent graphic story. The motifs are applied to many objects and almost all of these – mostly developed by the competition winner himself – applications reach after a short time collector status.

Even before WWII annual enamel plaques were made as memento for the competitors.

History 

 June 23, 1882 20 sailing yachts (one of them Danish) participate in a ship race from Düsternbrook. Because of the large success the event is held annually in the following years.
 1889 The German Emperor Wilhelm II visits the ship races for the first time.
 1892 More than 100 ships announce themselves for the ship races.
 1894 The event is called Kiel Week for the first time in press reports. Emperor Wilhelm II is a regular visitor now.
 1895 Opening of the Kiel Canal, then called Kaiser-Wilhelm-Kanal during Kiel Week.
 1907 25th anniversary of Kiel Week. Since then more than 6,000 ships have been racing at the event.
 1914 New canal locks are opened during Kiel Week. On June 28, Archduke Franz Ferdinand of Austria is murdered in Sarajevo, leading to World War I and interrupting Kiel Week. Between 1915–1918 Kiel Week is not held.
 1934 Kiel Week becomes an instrument of propaganda for the Nazis.
 1936 For the first time, Kiel is the location for the sailing contests at the Summer Olympics.
 1937 Kiel Week is organized by the newly formed Yacht-Club von Deutschland.
 1940–1946 During World War II, Kiel Week does not happen.
 1945 The first sailing week after the Second World War is held by the British occupation army under the name "Kiel-Week".
 1947 A festival week in September is held under the name 'Kiel im Aufbau' ('Kiel in reconstruction').
 * End of June 1948 First Kiel Week after the war.
 September 1948 "Kiel im Aufbau" held for the second time.
 1949 "Kiel im Aufbau" integrated into Kiel Week.
 1950 Theodor Heuss is the first President of Germany to visit Kiel Week.
 1962 Important Scandinavian theatre groups and orchestras set new accents for the cultural part of Kiel Week.
 1972 For the second time the sailing contests at the Summer Olympics are held in Kiel, finishing with a Tall Ships Parade.
 1974 The Spiellinie becomes a permanent institution at Kiel Week after the initial success of the Olympic Spielstraße for children in 1972. It is established along the Kiellinie.
 1982 100 years of Kiel Week celebrations.
 1994 100th Kiel Week celebrations (during the First and Second World Wars, Kiel Week was suspended); co-operation agreement with boot Düsseldorf.
 1995 100 years of the Kiel Canal (formerly Kaiser-Wilhelm-Canal) celebrations.

Classes

Olympic classes

International classes

Offshore classes
Albin Express
J/70
J/80
Melges 24
ORC
Platu 25
SB20
X-99

Winners

Current Olympic classes

Men's 470

1987 –  Wolfgang Hunger
1988 –  Wolfgang Hunger
1989 –  Ernst Meyer
1990 –  Tõnu Tõniste
1991 –  Wolfgang Hunger
1992 –  Herman Horn Johannessen
1993 –  Hunger & Schmidt
1994 –  John Merricks & Ian Walker
1995 –  Yevhen Braslavets & Ihor Matviyenko
1996 –  Dimitri Berezkin & Evgeniy Burmatnov
1997 –  Yevhen Braslavets & Ihor Matviyenko
1998 –  Paul Foerster & Roberet Merrick
1999 –  Gildas Philippe & Tanguy Carion
2000 –  Tom King & Mark Turnball
2001 –  Gabrio Zandonà & Andrea Trani
2002 –  Nathan Wilmot & Malcolm Page
2003 –  Yevhen Braslavets & Ihor Matviyenko
2004 –  Gabrio Zandonà & Andrea Trani
2005 –  Michael Anderson-Mitterling & David Hughes
2006 –  Mathew Belcher & Nick Behrends
2007 –  Gabrio Zandonà & Andrea Trani
2008 –  Tobias Etter & Felix Steiger
2009 –  Šime Fantela & Igor Marenić
2010 –  Mathew Belcher & Malcolm Page
2011 –  Mathew Belcher & Malcolm Page
2012 –  Ferdinand Gerz & Patrick Follmann
2013 –  Luke Patience & Joe Glanfield
2014 –  Panagiotis Mantis & Pavlos Kagialis
2015 –  Šime Fantela & Igor Marenić
2016 –  Ferdinand Gerz & Oliver Szymanski
2017 –  Mathew Belcher & Will Ryan

Women's 470

1987 –  Fiona Galloway
1988 –  Susanne Meyer
1989 –  Susanne Meyer
1990 –  Susanne Meyer
1991 –  Larissa Moskalenko
1992 –  Yumiko Shige
1993 –  Susanne Meyer & Katrin Adlkofer
1994 –  Yumiko Shige & Alicia Kinoshita
1995 –  Yumiko Shige & Alicia Kinoshita
1996 –  Vlada Krachun & Natalia Gaponovich
1997 –  Ruslana Taran & Olena Pakholchyk
1998 –  Susanne Ward & Michaela Ward
1999 –  Ruslana Taran & Olena Pakholchyk
2000 –  Ruslana Taran & Olena Pakholchyk
2001 –  Sofia Bekatorou & Emilia Tsoulfa
2002 –  Jenny Amstrong & Belinda Stowell
2003 –  Alina Grobe & Vivien Kussatz
2004 –  Jenny Amstrong & Belinda Stowell
2005 –  Elise Rechichi & Tessa Parkinson
2006 –  Elise Rechichi & Tessa Parkinson
2007 –  Sylvia Vogl & Carolina Flatscher
2008 –  Ai Kondo & Naoko Kamata
2009 –  Lisa Westerhof & Lobke Berkhout
2010 –  Sarah Ayton & Saskia Clark
2011 –  Erin Maxwell & Isabelle Farrar
2012 –  Annika Bochmann
2013 –  Sophie Weguelin & Eilidh McIntyre
2014 –  Annina Wagner & Elisabeth Panuschka
2015 –  Lara Vadlau & Jolanta Ogar
2016 –  Alisa Kirilyuk & Liudmila Dmitrieva
2017 –  Frederike Loewe & Anna Markfort

49er

1997 –  Chris Nicholson & Daniel Phillips
1998 –  Francesco Bruni & Gabriele Bruni
1999 –  Adam Beashel & Teague Czislowski
2000 –  Francesco Bruni & Gabriele Bruni
2001 –  Paul Brotherton & Simon Hiscocks
2002 –  Tom Fitzpatrick & Fraser Brown
2003 –  Chris Draper & Simon Hiscocks
2004 –  Pietro Sibello & Gianfranco Sibello
2005 –  Chris Draper & Simon Hiscocks
2006 –  Pietro Sibello & Gianfranco Sibello
2007 –  Marcus Baur & Hannes Baumann
2008 –  Iker Martínez de Lizarduy & Xabier Fernández
2009 –  Lennart Briesenick-Pudenz & Morten Massmann
2010 –  John Pink & Rick Peacock
2011 –  Tobias Schadewaldt & Hannes Baumann
2012 –  Tobias Schadewaldt & Hannes Baumann
2013 –  Nico Delle Karth & Nikolaus Leopold Resch
2014 –  Erik Heil & Thomas Ploessel
2015 –  Justus Schmidt & Max Boehme
2016 –  Peter Burling & Blair Tuke
2017 –  David Gilmour & Joel Turner

49er FX

2013 –  Tina Lutz & Susann Beucke
2014 –  Támara Echegoyen & Berta Betanzos
2015 –  Annemiek Bekkering & Daniel Bramervaer
2016 –  Tina Lutz & Susann Beucke
2017 –  Charlotte Dobson & Saskia Tidey

Men's Finn

1985 –  Brian Ledbetter
1987 –  Oleg Khoperski
1988 –  Stig Westergaard
1989 –  Mats Caap
1990 –  Hans Spitzauer
1991 –  Anders Lundmark
1992 –  José van der Ploeg
1993 –  Fredrik Lööf
1994 –  Hans Spitzauer
1995 –  Xavier Rohart
1996 –  Michal Maier
1997 –  Hans Spitzauer
1998 –  Mateusz Kusznierewicz
1999 –  Mateusz Kusznierewicz
2000 –  Sebastian Godefroid
2001 –  Michael Fellmann
2002 –  Mateusz Kusznierewicz
2003 –  Sebastien Godefroid
2004 –  Rafael Trujillo
2005 –  Jasper Vincec
2006 –  Dan Slater
2007 –  Jasper Vincec
2008 –  Ed Wright
2009 –  Rafal Szukiel
2010 –  Ivan Kljaković Gašpić
2011 –  Ed Wright
2012 –  Deniss Karpak
2013 –  Mark Andrews
2014 –  Deniss Karpak
2015 –  Deniss Karpak
2016 –  Phillip Kasüske
2017 –  Deniss Karpak

Men's Laser

1987 –  Stefan Warkalla
1988 –  Stefan Warkalla
1989 –  Martin Fahr
1990 –  Glenn Bourke
1991 –  Michael Hestbæk
1992 –  Michael Hestbæk
1993 –  Klaus Lahme
1994 –  John Harrysson
1995 –  Peer Moberg
1996 –  Jens Eckardt
1997 –  Karl Suneson
1998 –  Ben Ainslie
1999 –  Robert Scheidt
2000 –  Robert Scheidt
2001 –  Daniel Birgmark
2002 –  Daniel Birgmark
2003 –  Maciej Grabowski
2004 –  Robert Scheidt
2005 –  Paul Goodison
2006 –  Paul Goodison
2007 –  Michael Blackburn
2008 –  Tom Slingsby
2009 –  Paul Goodison
2010 –  Tom Slingsby
2011 –  Simon Grotelüschen
2012 –  Philipp Buhl
2013 –  Philipp Buhl
2014 –  Philipp Buhl
2015 –  Tobias Schadewaldt
2016 –  Philipp Buhl
2017 –  Francesco Marrai

Women's Laser Radial

2005 –  Gintarė Volungevičiūtė
2006 –  Petra Niemann
2007 –  Jo Aleh
2008 –  Sophie de Turckheim
2009 –  Paige Railey
2010 –  Paige Railey
2011 –  Paige Railey
2012 –  Tatiana Drozdovskaya
2013 –  Tuula Tenkanen
2014 –  Tatiana Drozdovskaya
2015 –  Erika Reineke
2016 –  Tiril Hartvedt Bue
2017 –  Silvia Zennaro

Nacra 17

2013 –  Iker Martínez de Lizarduy & Tara Pacheco
2014 –  Vittorio Bissaro & Silvia Sicouri
2015 –  Paul Kohlhoff & Carolina Werner
2016 –  Paul Kohlhoff & Carolina Werner
2017 –  Thomas Zajac & Barbara Matz

Men's RS:X

2005 –  Chi Ho Ho
2006 –  Maksym Oberemkom
2007 –  Maksymilian Wojcik
2008 –  Piotr Myszka
2009 –  Przemysław Miarczyński
2010 –  Julien Bontemps
2011 –  Przemysław Miarczyński

Women's RS:X

2005 –  Chan Wai Kei
2006 –  Olga Maslivets
2007 –  Agata Brygota
2008 –  Romy Kinzl
2009 –  Moana Delle
2010 –  Brygola Agata
2011 –  Jessica Grisp

Men's classes

Men's Mistral

Men's Europe

1987 –  Henrik Jacobsen
1988 –  Peer Moberg
1989 –  Valerio Chinca
1990 –  Kim Christensen
1991 –  Jan Christiansen
1992 –  Søren Johnsen
1993 –  Søren Johnsen
1994 –  Søren Johnsen
1995 –  Kai Redemann
1996 –  Bernhard Krüger
1997 –  Jacek Zbierski
1998 –  Jacek Zbierski
1999 –  Jacek Zbierski
2000 –  Mats Wang-Hansen
2001 –  Tim Kirchhoff
2002 –  Søren Johnsen
2003 –  Søren Johnsen
2004 –  Mikkel Bonde

Men's Star

1987 –  Ed Adams
1988 –  Anders Geert Jensen
1989 –  Torben Grael
1990 –  Torben Grael
1991 –  Hans Vogt, Jr.
1992 –  Torben Grael
1993 –  Alexander Hagen & Falkenthal
1994 –  Hans Wallén & Bobby Lohse
1995 –  Torben Grael & Marcelo Ferreira
1996 –  Colin Beashel & David Giles
1997 –  Frank Butzmann & Jens Peters
1998 –  Colin Beashel & David Giles
1999 –  Mats Johansson & Leif Möller
2000 –  Mark Reynolds & Magnus Liljedahl
2001 –  Torben Grael & Marcelo Ferreira
2002 –  Mark Reynolds & Magnus Liljedahl
2003 –  Marc Aurel Pickel & Tony Kolb
2004 –  Peter Bromby & Lee White
2005 –  Mateusz Kusznierewicz
2006 –  Mark Mendelblatt & Mark Strube
2007 –  Hans Spitzauer & Christian Nehammer
2008 –  Fredrik Lööf & Anders Ekström
2009 –  Mark Mendelblatt & Mark Strube
2010 –  Robert Scheidt & Bruno Prada
2011 –  Flavio Marazzi & Enrico De Maria
2012 –  Johannes Polgar & Markus Koy
2013 –  Denis Khashina & Dmitry Mechetin

Women's classes

Women's Elliott 6m

2009 –  Katie Spithill,  Nina Curtis & Nicole Douglass
2010 –  Yekaterina Skudina
2011 –  Yekaterina Skudina, Yelena Oblova & Yelena Syuzeva

Women's Europe

1989 –  Sabrina Landi
1990 –  Tine Moberg-Parker
1991 –  Tine Moberg-Parker
1992 –  Karin Andersson
1993 –  Tine Moberg-Parker
1994 –  Tine Moberg-Parker
1995 –  Carolina Toll
1996 –  Karianne Eikeland
1997 –  Kristine Roug
1998 –  Carolijn Brouwer
1999 –  Kristine Roug
2000 –  Kristine Roug
2001 –  Christiane Petzke
2002 –  Carolijn Brouwer
2003 –  Petra Niemann
2004 –  Tatiana Drozdovskaya

Women's Mistral

Open classes

12 Metre

2015 –  Anitra – Josef Martin, Sven Oliver Buder, Tim Eggert, Peter Graf, Oliver Huber, Dierck Jensen, Andre Koslowsky, Johann Kraus, Wolfgang Leuthe, Björn Leuthe, Sven Martin, Petra Mehrbad, David Segbert & Ulli Sommerlath
2016 –  Vim – Andrea Proto, Peter Müller, Ole Skov, Natale Proto, Mads Groth, Troels Bækholm, Nikolaj Nielsen, Caspar Kiellerop Larsen, Stefan Zeyse, Jens Holmberg, Jens Möller, Leerke Nergaavel, Tommy Olsson, Lef Motte, Mads Walther, & Stig Westergaard
2017 –  Kiwi Magic – Johan Blach Petersen & crew

2.4 Metre

2002 –  Heiko Kröger
2003 –  Jens Als Andersen
2004 –  Heiko Kröger
2005 –  Heiko Kröger
2006 –  Damien Seguin
2007 –  Thierry Schmitter
2008 –  Damien Seguin
2009 –  Heiko Kröger
2010 –  Heiko Kröger
2011 –  Megan Pascoe
2012 –  Damien Seguin
2013 –  Heiko Kröger
2014 –  Heiko Kröger
2015 –  Heiko Kröger
2016 –  Heiko Kröger
2017 –  Heiko Kröger

29er

2005 –  Benjamin Friedhoff & Johanna Munding
2006 –  Benjamin Friedhoff & Johanna Munding
2007 –  Benjamin Friedhoff & Johanna Munding
2008 –  Kévin Fischer & Glenn Gouron
2009 –  Kévin Fischer & Glenn Gouron
2010 –  Domagoj Fizulic & Tomislav Bašić
2011 –  Josh Franklin & Lewis Brake
2012 –  Carlos Robles & Florian Trittel
2013 –  Lucas Rual & Emile Amoro
2014 –  Adrian Salamon & Julius Hallstrom
2015 –  Peter Lin Janezic & Anze Podlogar
2016 –  Gwendal Lamay & Luke Willim
2017 –  Benjamin Jaffrezic & Léo Chauvel

420

1987 –  Jens Olbrysch & Bernd Oster
1988 –  Stefanie Wagner
1989 –  Luc Angels
1990 –  Marcus Bauer
1991 –  Zeev Kalach & Shamgar Gurevich
1992 –  Uta Kock
1993 –  Schütt & Eberhardt
1994 –  Robert Greenhalgh & Peter Greenhalgh
1996 –  Etienne Huter & Pierre Huter
1997 –  Xavier Vandeghinste & Quentin Blondieu
1998 –  Nicolas Charbonnier & David Deguine
1999 –  Allan Nørregaard & Henrik Jorgensen
2000 –  Luca Bursic & Jacob Thomas
2001 –  Jong-woo Park & Dong-woo Lee
2002 –  Nic Asher & Elliot Willis
2003 –  José Antonio Medina Ruiz & Onán Barreiros
2004 –  Nathan Outteridge & Iain Jensen
2005 –  Farokh Tarapore & Vikas Kapila
2006 –  Susanne Baur & Katharina Berggren
2007 –  Florian Dziesiaty & Oliver Szymanski
2008 –  Maccari Federico & Vitali Rocco
2009 –  Philip Sparks & Ben Gratton
2010 –  Justin Liu & Sherman Cheng
2011 –  Angus Galloway & Alexander Gough
2012 –  Nadja Horwitz & Francisca Fuentes
2013 –  Jan Borbet & Kilian Northoff
2014 –  Abu Maor & Rooz Yoav
2015 –  Wiley Rogers & Jack Parkin
2016 –  Wiley Rogers & Jack Parkin
2017 –  Telis Athanasopoulos Yogo & Dimitrios Tassios

5.5 Metre

2016 –  Ger Schmitz, Uli Ellerbeck, & Gerhard Kruse
2017 –  Hans Köster, Johannes Hensler, Jacob Oersted, & Lea Rüdiger

505

1994 –  Tim Böger & Holger Jess
1995 –  Jeremy Robinson & Bill Masterman
1996 –  Thomas Gosch & Rolf Meyer
1997 –  Wolfgang Hunger & Holger Jess
1998 –  Wolfgang Hunger & Holger Jess
1999 –  Wolfgang Hunger & Holger Jess
2000 –  Wolfgang Hunger & Holger Jess
2001 –  Krister Bergstrom & Thomas Moss
2002 –  Wolfgang Hunger & Holger Jess
2003 –  Claas Lehmann & Martin Schöler
2004 –  Wolfgang Hunger & Holger Jess
2005 –  Claas Lehmann & Martin Schöler
2006 –  Jan Saugmann & Morten Ramsbaek
2007 –  Wolfgang Hunger & Holger Jess
2008 –  Wolfgang Hunger & Julien Kleiner
2009 –  Wolfgang Hunger & Julien Kleiner
2010 –  Wolfgang Hunger & Julien Kleiner
2011 –  Wolfgang Hunger & Julien Kleiner
2012 –  Wolfgang Hunger & Julien Kleiner
2013 –  Wolfgang Hunger & Julien Kleiner
2014 –  Jan-Philipp Hofmann & Felix Brockerhoff
2015 –  Meike Schomäker & Holger Jess
2016 –  Andy Smith & Tim Needham
2017 –  Jørgen Bojsen-Møller & Jacob Bojsen-Møller

Albin Ballad

2016 –   Michael Langhans, Jan Lok, Birgit Ehlers, & Thomas Wiese
2015 –  Klaus Lange

Albin Express

2015 –  Arne K. Larssen
2016 –  Jan Brink, Jan Günther, Jörg Rüterhenke, & Jens Lücke
2017 –  Jan Brink, Jörg Rüterhenke, Lasse Waltje, & Jan Günther

Contender

1995 –  Jan von der Bank
1996 –  Graham Scott
1997 –  Ian Renilson
1998 –  Andreas Bonezzi
1999 –  Claus Staffe
2000 –  Claus Staffe
2001 –  Gabriel Wicke
2002 –  Andreas Bonezzi
2003 –  Jan von der Bank
2004 –  Andreas Bonezzi
2005 –  Jan von der Bank
2006 –  Andreas Bonezzi
2007 –  Jan van der Bank
2008 –  Christoph Homeier
2009 –  Jan von der Bank
2010 –  Bjarke Johnsen
2011 –  Christoph Homeier
2012 –  Sören Andreasen Dulong
2013 –  Mark Bulka
2014 –  Søren Dulong Andreasen
2015 –  Jesper Nielsen
2016 –  Søren Dulong Andreasen
2017 –  Jesper Nielsen

Europe

2005 –  Jacob Ege Friis
2006 –  Teemu Rantanen
2007 –  Christian Rindom
2008 –  Sönke Herrmann
2009 –  Thomas Ribeaud
2010 –  Sylvain Notonier
2011 –  Sylvain Notonier
2012 –  Sylvain Notonier
2013 –  Lars Johan Brodtkorb
2014 –  Anna Munch
2015 –  Fabian Kirchhoff
2016 –  Lars Johan Brodtkorb
2017 –  Anna Livbjerg
2016 –  Lars Johan Brodtkorb
2017 –  Anna Livbjerg

Farr 30

2015 –  Harald Brüning

Flying Dutchman

1987 –  Sergei Borodniov
1988 –  Jørgen Bojsen-Møller
1989 –  Willem Potma
1990 –  Jörn Borowski
1991 –  Markus Wieser
1992 –  Markus Wieser
1993 –  Bojsen-Moeller & Jespersen
1994 –  Jørgen Bojsen-Møller & Jacob Bojsen-Møller
1996 –  Eddy Eich & Ben Hagemeyer
1997 –  Jørgen Bojsen-Møller & Jacob Bojsen-Møller
1998 –  Jørgen Bojsen-Møller & Jacob Bojsen-Møller
1999 –  Jørgen Bojsen-Møller & Jacob Bojsen-Møller
2000 –  Jørgen Bojsen-Møller & Jacob Bojsen-Møller
2001 –  Jørgen Bojsen-Møller & Jacob Bojsen-Møller
2002 –  Hans Genthe & Hauke Drengenberg
2003 –  Jørgen Bojsen-Møller & Jacob Bojsen-Møller
2004 –  Jørgen Bojsen-Møller & Jacob Bojsen-Møller
2005 –  Jørgen Bojsen-Møller & Jacob Bojsen-Møller
2006 –  Jørgen Bojsen-Møller & Jacob Bojsen-Møller
2007 –  Jørgen Bojsen-Møller & Jacob Bojsen-Møller
2008 –  Jørgen Bojsen-Møller & Jacob Bojsen-Møller
2009 –  Szabolcs Majthényi & András Domokos
2010 –  Szabolcs Majthényi & András Domokos
2011 –  Szabolcs Majthényi & András Domokos
2012 –  Szabolcs Majthényi & András Domokos
2013 –  Kilian König & Johannes Brack
2014 –  Szabolcs Majthényi & András Domokos
2015 –  Shmuel Markhoff & Michael Happich
2016 –  Kilian König & Johannes Brack
2017 –  Kay-Uwe Lüdtke & Kai Schäfers

Formula 18

2015 –  Helge Sach & Christian Sach
2016 –  Helge Sach & Christian Sach
2017 –  Iordanis Paschalidis & Konstantinos Trigkonis

H-boat

1987 –  Juhani Seppae
1988 –  Gerd Eiermann
1989 –  Gerd Eiermann
1990 –  Henrik Edmann
1991 –  Gerd Eiermann
1992 –  Theis Palm
1993 –  Vincent Hösch
1994 –  Vincent Hösch, Wolfgang Nothegger & Stefan Abel
1995 –  Ross McDonald, Phil Trinter & Hugo Dölfes
1996 –  Wolfgang Döring, Butze Bredt & Sönke Wunderlich
1997 –  Herluf Jörgensen, Chrestian Pasbjerg & Sören Nielsen
1998 –  Herluf Jörgensen, Chrestian Pasbjerg & Per Petersen
1999 –  Bo Selko, Jonas Pedersen & Niels Sörensen
2000 –  Bo Selko, Jonas Pedersen & Kenneth Bogild
2001 –  Dirk Stadler, Nils Ubert & Kai Schnellbacher
2002 –  Herluf Jörgensen, Chrestian Pasbjerg & Fin Nicolaisen
2003 –  Harald Wefers, Niels Körte & Soenke Asta Durst
2004 –  Herluf Jörgensen, Chrestian Pasbjerg & Christian Justesen
2005 –  Morten Nielsen, Per Kloster & Niels Hendrik Borch
2006 –  Hans Peulen, Patrick Vraneken & Peter Snellens
2007 –  Steffen Stegger, Lars Christiansen & Carsten Pedersen Guffi
2008 –  Steffen Stegger, Lars Christiansen & Carsten Pedersen Guffi
2009 –  Steffen Stegger, Lars Christiansen & Carsten Pedersen Guffi
2010 –  Mads P. G. Korsgaard, Uffe Dreiser & Anders Rydlöv 
2011 –  Steffen Stegger, Lars Christiansen & Carsten Pedersen Guffi
2012 –  Steffen Stegger, Lars Christiansen & Carsten Pedersen Guffi
2015 –  Peter Zauner, Timo von Schorlemer, Maren Bertling & Frank Hummel

Hobie 16

2015 –  Detlef Mohr & Karen Wichardt
2016 –  Ingo Delius & Kai Tittjung
2017 –  Knud Jansen & Christina Schober

J/24

2015 –  Ian Southworth
2016 –  Tobias Feuerherdt, Jan-Marc Ulrich, Lukas Feuerherdt, Tobias Peters, & Justus Fritz Kellner
2017 –  Mike Ingham, Max Holzer, Marianne Schoke, Quinn Schwenker, & Paul Abdullah

J/70

2015 –  Hugo Rocha
2017 –  Jens Marten, Justus Braatz, Terje Klockemann, & Tobias Strenge

J/80

2015 –  Martin Menzner
2016 –  Martin Menzner, Mika Rolfs, Frank Lichte, & Nils Beltermann
2017 –  Martin Menzner, Frank Lichte, Mika Rolfs, & Nils Beltermann

Laser 4.7

2015 –  Julia Büsselberg
2016 –  Maksim Dziahel
2017 –  Tobias Sandmo Birkeland

Laser Radial

2015 –  Haddon Hughes
2016 –  Aleksi Tapper
2017 –  Caroline Sofia Rosmo

Melges 24

2015 –  Kim Christensen
2016 –  Andrea Pozzi, Stefan Ciampalini, Giuluo Desiderato, Carlo Zermini, & Nicolas Dal Ferro
2017 –  Lennart Burke, Johan Müller, Valentin Ahlhaus, Daniel Schmidt, & Thore Petersen

Musto Skiff

2015 –  Ben Schooling
2016 –  Frithjof Schwerdt

Nordic Folkboat

1957 –  Ejnar Christensen
1958 –  Henning Olsen
1959 –  Ejnar Christensen
1960 –  Christian Lageri-Schmidt
1961 –  Henning Olsen
1962 –  Børge Jespersen
1963 –  Mogens Petersen
1964 –  Mogens Petersen
1965 –  Mogens Petersen
1966 –  G. Kroll
1967 –  Claus Hjort, Ove Hjort & Karsten Ask
1968 –  Claus Hjort, Ove Hjort & Karsten Ask
1969 –  Claus Hjort, Ove Hjort & Karsten Ask
1970 –  Claus Hjort, Ove Hjort & Karsten Ask
1971 –  Walther Muhs
1972 –  Andreas Christiansen & Knud Christiansen
1973 –  Claus Hjort, Ove Hjort & Karsten Ask
1974 –  Claus Hjort, Ove Hjort & Karsten Ask
1975 –  Erik Andreasen, Jørgen Knudsen & Chresten Kold
1976 –  Claus Hjort, Ove Hjort & Karsten Ask
1977 –  Flemming Hansen, Niels Andersen & Bent Christensen
1978 –  Ernst August Rasmussen, Klaus Rasmussen & Aksel Andreasen
1979 –  Dieter Kipcke
1980 –  Henrik Kold
1981 –  Erik Andereasen, Peter West, Jens Budtz & Mogens Pedersen
1982 –  Henrik Sørensen, John Skjoldby & Erling Rasmussen
1983 –  Erik Andreasen
1984 –  Rene Mørch, Lauge Larsen & Stig Pallisbeck
1985 –  Rene Mørch, Lauge Larsen & Stig Pallisbeck
1986 –  Erik Andreasen, Lotte Andreasen, Bjørn Clausen & Mette S. Andersen
1987 –  Rene Mørch, John Skjoldby & Lauge Larsen
1988 –  Horst Stephan Schultze
1987 –  Rene Moerck
1988 –  Thorsten Dmach
1989 –  Erik Andreasen
1990 –  Manfred Baum
1991 –  Flemming Rost
1992 –  Jürgen Breitenbach
1993 –  H. Reese
1994 –  Erik Andreasen, Paul Ankjaer & Mogens Pedersen
1995 –  Jesper Bendix, Jacob Gronsbach & Jesper Baungaard
1996 –  Torben Olesen, Lars Dalborge & Palle Hemdorf
1997 –  Peter Due, Kurt Petersen & Ole Christensen
1998 –  Henrik Kold, Claus Skov Nielsen & Jens Lorentzen
1999 –  Henrik Kold, Claus Skov Nielsen & Per Hovmark
2000 –  Jens Thuroe, Mette Thuroe & Knud Andersen
2001 –  Kim Fogde, Peter Andersen & Tonny Poulsen
2002 –  Per Hovmark, Soren Bredal & Claus Lauritsen
2003 –  Per Jørgensen, Lars Jørgensen
2004 –  Kim Koch Fodge, Tonny Povlsen & Allan Hansen
2005 –  Per Jørgensen, Lars Jørgensen & Claus Skov Nielsen
2006 –  Christoph Nielsen, Torben Dehn & Björge Dehn
2007 –  Christoph Nielsen, Torben Dehn & Jimi Reichenberger
2008 –  Per Jørgensen, Lars Jørgensen & Kristian Hansen
2009 –  Christoph Nielsen, Torben Dehn & Krzystof Paschke
2010 –  Per Jørgensen, Kristian Hansen & Kjeld Skov 
2011 –  John Wulff, Benny Christensen & Bent Mallemuk Nielsen
2012 –  Walther Furthmann, Hans Christian Mrowka & Paul Grolstein
2013 –  Christoph Nielsen, Florian Raudaschel, Torben Dehn & Klaus Reichenberger
2014 –  Per Buch, Hans Schultz & Per Puck
2015 –  Ulf Kipcke, Dieter Kipcke & Gero Martens
2016 –  Ulf Kipcke, Dieter Kipcke, & Gero Martens
2017 –  Per Jørgensen, Kristian Hansen, & Bent Nielsen

OK

2015 –  Charlie Cumbley
2016 –  Thomas Hansson-Mild
2017 –  Jim Hunt

RS800

2015 –  Phil Walker & John Mather

Sonar

2014 –  Jens Kroker, Robert Prem & Siggy Mainka
2016 –  Lasse Klötzing, Siegmund Mainka, & Jens Kroker

See also
 Cowes Week
 Royal Hobart Regatta
 Barcolana regatta

References
. Description by a German officer of the visit by a squadron of British warships attending Kiel week in June 1914. Available at Canadian library archive

External links
 Kiel Week website
 Kiel Week website

Annual sporting events in Germany
Sport in Kiel
Sailing competitions in Germany
Tourist attractions in Schleswig-Holstein
Sailing regattas
Recurring sporting events established in 1882
1882 establishments in Germany
Sailing World Cup
EUROSAF Champions Sailing Cup
Week-long events